Leucanopsis huacina is a moth of the family Erebidae. It was described by William Schaus in 1933. It is found in Peru.

References

huacina
Moths described in 1933